The Innocent was the last film made by Italian director Luchino Visconti. Released in 1976, the film is based on the novel The Intruder by Gabriele d'Annunzio. It was distributed in the U.S. by Analysis Film Releasing Corp.

The main shooting locations were the Villa Mirafiori in Rome, the Villa Butori in Lucca and the Villa Bellosguardo nearby. The soundtrack includes Wolfgang Amadeus Mozart's Rondò Alla Turca and the aria Che farò senza Euridice from Christoph Willibald Gluck's Orfeo ed Euridice.

Plot
The story is set in the late nineteenth century. Tullio Hermil (Giancarlo Giannini), a wealthy Roman aristocrat married to Giuliana (Laura Antonelli), has a possessive aristocratic mistress, Teresa Raffo (Jennifer O'Neill), and neglects his wife.

His interest in his wife is rekindled when he sees Giuliana's happiness after she has begun a love affair with a novelist, Filippo d'Arborio. She becomes pregnant by d'Arborio. Tullio urges an abortion but she refuses; d'Arborio then dies of a tropical infection.

Tullio cannot tolerate the healthy male child delivered to Giuliana, although he tries. While the family are at Christmas mass he exposes the baby and it dies, apparently of natural causes. Giuliana, who knows Tullio has murdered the baby, leaves him.

Tullio attempts to rekindle his affair with Teresa and takes her to his town house where they attempt to make love. When she tells him she no longer loves him, he shoots himself. Teresa picks up her belongings and leaves the estate.

Cast

Giancarlo Giannini: Tullio Hermil
Laura Antonelli: Giuliana Hermil
Jennifer O'Neill: Teresa Raffo
Rina Morelli:  Tullio's Mother
Marc Porel: Filippo d'Arborio
Massimo Girotti: Count Stefano Egano
Didier Haudepin: Federico Hermil
Marie Dubois: The Princess 
Roberta Paladini: Miss Elviretta
Claude Mann: The Prince

Visconti originally wanted Alain Delon and Romy Schneider for the roles played by Giannini and Antonelli. But Schneider was unavailable, and Delon was uncomfortable with the idea of working with Visconti in what he considered to be a diminished state, post-stroke. Also considered for a role was Charlotte Rampling, who said Visconti wrote the screenplay with her in mind, but she was unable to do the movie because she was filming Foxtrot.

Reception
The Innocent received a mixed to positive critical reception. The film holds a 75% rating on Rotten Tomatoes based on twenty reviews.

Awards
David di Donatello
Winner:  Best Music (Migliore Musica) - Franco Mannino

See also 
 List of Italian films of 1976

References

External links
 
 
 "L'Innocente" Nouveau Entertainment Ltd - Region 2- PAL
 Great French site about Visconti

1976 films
1976 drama films
Italian drama films
Italian epic films
Films based on Italian novels
Films based on works by Gabriele D'Annunzio
Films directed by Luchino Visconti
Films with screenplays by Suso Cecchi d'Amico
Films set in the 1890s
Films set in Rome
1979 drama films
1979 films
1970s Italian films